The Humans is a 2021 American psychological drama film written and directed by Stephen Karam in his feature directorial debut, and based on his one-act play of the same name. It stars Richard Jenkins, Jayne Houdyshell, Amy Schumer, Beanie Feldstein, Steven Yeun and June Squibb. It had its world premiere at the 2021 Toronto International Film Festival on September 12, 2021. The film was released by A24 on November 24, 2021, both in theaters and on Showtime.

Plot
On Thanksgiving, Erik and Deirdre Blake, their daughter Aimee, and Erik's senile mother, Momo, visit their other daughter, Brigid, at her new apartment that she shares with her partner, Richard. Erik is immediately disapproving of the apartment, as it is run-down, in a flood risk zone, and close to Ground Zero. He has lingering trauma from 9/11: he had driven Aimee to a job interview on that day, and had planned to visit the observation deck of the Twin Towers, but had waited across the street as the deck had not yet opened for the morning. He has also been haunted by memories of seeing a deceased victim who resembled Aimee.

As the evening wears on, tension and unhappiness in the family is evident. Brigid is openly resentful that her parents have not given her money to afford a better lifestyle, and privately wounded that her dreams of being a composer have not come into fruition; she has been rejected multiple times and struggles to find employment. Both she and her partner face Deirdre's disapproval that they are not yet married. Richard has struggled with depression and is treading water in his personal life and career, as he will be a recipient of a trust fund that he will not receive until he is 40, five years from now. Aimee suffers from a chronic illness, recently lost both her job and her longtime girlfriend, and will need to get her colon removed. Deirdre suffers from her own health problems and is on the receiving end of mockery from the rest of the family due to her religious attitude, and Erik, already depressed over Momo's condition, clashes with Brigid by judging her work ethic and new-age, urbanite lifestyle. There is a brief respite when Deirdre reads the daughter a letter that Momo wrote when still lucid, apologizing for her deterioration and assuring them that she will always love them, and to not get so worked up over life's problems.

The family eventually begins talking about their dreams and nightmares. Richard is open and honest about his own, but Erik is reserved about revealing his own. Eventually, he confesses that he suffers from nightmares about a faceless woman, implied to be reflective of his 9/11 trauma. The rest of the family teases him about the faceless woman, much to his discomfort. After dinner is over, the power goes out, plunging the apartment into darkness. Brigid and Aimee assure their parents that they can enjoy a relaxing vacation at the family's beloved lake house, only for Deirdre to admit that they had to sell it in order to fund Momo's care. The daughters receive another bombshell: Erik was fired from his longtime job as a janitor of a Catholic school and had his pension revoked, after he was found to be having an affair with one of the teachers at the school. Despite Erik's assurance that he and Deirdre received counseling and have moved past his infidelity, the daughters are appalled and disillusioned with their father.

As Thanksgiving ends, the visiting family members depart for a hotel. As the rest help Momo get into the taxi, Erik lingers behind in the apartment, attempting to fix the power outage; however, he becomes disoriented and suffers a panic attack in the darkness, leaving him whimpering and praying. He only comes to his senses when Brigid re-enters the apartment to collect him, and they leave together.

Cast
Beanie Feldstein as Brigid Blake
Richard Jenkins as Erik Blake
Jayne Houdyshell as Deirdre Blake
Amy Schumer as Aimee Blake
Steven Yeun as Richard
June Squibb as Momo

Production
A24, IAC, Scott Rudin and Eli Bush made a deal in March 2019 with Stephen Karam to adapt his play into a feature-length film. Jayne Houdyshell was set to reprise her role from the Broadway production in the film, with Beanie Feldstein, Richard Jenkins, Amy Schumer, and Steven Yeun also cast. In April 2021, Scott Rudin was removed as a producer on the film, following allegations of abuse.

Principal photography began in September 2019, in New York City.

Release
The Humans premiered at the 2021 Toronto International Film Festival on September 12, 2021. The film screened at over 25 film festivals including Austin (Centerpiece screening), Indianapolis (Centerpiece screening), Nashville (Closing Night), Middleburg, San Diego, Philadelphia, Denver, and Savannah. The film was simultaneously released in theaters and aired on Showtime on November 24, 2021.

Reception
 Metacritic assigned the film a weighted average score of 78 out of 100 based on 38 critics, indicating "generally favorable reviews".

The film landed on several 2021 Top 10 lists including Vanity Fair, the Associated Press, The Guardian, Vogue, The Austin Chronicle, RogerEbert.com, The Hollywood Reporter, and Indiewire's list of top first feature films of 2021. The film was selected as a "Critic's Pick" from The New York Times.

Awards and nominations

References

External links
 
 
 
 Official screenplay

2021 films
2021 directorial debut films
2021 drama films
2021 independent films
2020s English-language films
2020s psychological drama films
A24 (company) films
American films based on plays
American psychological drama films
Films about dysfunctional families
Films scored by Nico Muhly
Films set in New York City
Films shot in New York City
Films with screenplays by Stephen Karam
Thanksgiving in films
2020s American films